Erato is a genus of small sea snails, marine gastropod molluscs in the family Eratoidae, the trivias and allies.

The genus name is taken from the name of the Greek muse Erato.

Species
Species within the genus Erato include:
 Erato albescens Dall, 1905 - whitish erato
 † Erato andecavica Schilder, 1933 
 † Erato aquitanica F. A. Schilder, 1932 
 † Erato britannica Schilder, 1933 
 † Erato clifdenensis Laws, 1935 
 † Erato cooperi Fehse & Landau, 2002 
 † Erato crassa Fehse, 2020 
 † Erato cypraeola (Brocchi, 1814) 
 † Erato fragilis Fehse, 2020 
 † Erato incrassata Coppi, 1876 
 † Erato italica F. A. Schilder, 1932 
 † Erato kimakowiczi O. Boettger, 1884 
 † Erato laevilabiata Sacco, 1894 
 † Erato lozoueti Fehse, 2018 
 † Erato marshalli Marwick, 1929 
 Erato oligostata Dall, 1902
 † Erato pinguis Fehse, 2020 
 † Erato planulosa Sacco, 1894 
 † Erato praecedens F. A. Schilder, 1933 
 † Erato praecursor Cossmann & Pissarro, 1905 
 Erato prayensis Rochebrune, 1882
 Erato princeps Fehse, 2020 
 † Erato prodromos Fehse, 2018 
 † Erato prokimakowiczi Fehse, 2020 
 † Erato prolaevis Sacco, 1894 
 † Erato quasiplanulosa Fehse, 2020 
 † Erato senecta R. Murdoch, 1924 
 † Erato subcypraeola d'Orbigny, 1852 
 † Erato submorosa Laws, 1935 
 † Erato tenuipustulata Fehse, 2020 
 † Erato transiens Boettger, 1884
 † Erato uniplicata Depontaillier, 1881
 Erato voluta (Montagu, 1803)
 † Erato vulcania Marwick, 1926 
 † Erato waitakiensis Laws, 1935 

Species brought into synonymy
 Erato africana Fehse, 2016: synonym of Erato prayensis Rochebrune, 1882
 Erato angistoma G. B. Sowerby II, 1832: synonym of Alaerato angistoma (Sowerby II, 1832)
 Erato bimaculata Tate, 1878: synonym of Cypraeerato bimaculata (Tate, 1878)
 Erato columbella Menke, 1847 - pigeon erato: synonym of Hespererato columbella (Menke, 1847)
 Erato cypraeoides C. B. Adams, 1845: synonym of Pachybathron cypraeoides (C. B. Adams, 1845)
 Erato edentula Bozzetti, 2009: synonym of Sulcerato recondita (Melvill & Standen, 1903) (probable synonym)
 Erato gallinacea (Hinds, 1844): synonym of Alaerato gallinacea (Hinds, 1844)
 Erato grata T. Cossignani & V. Cossignani, 1997: synonym of Eratoena grata (T. Cossignani & V. Cossignani, 1997)
 Erato guttula Sowerby, 1832: synonym of Serrata guttula (Sowerby, 1832)
 Erato haematina Sowerby, 1859: synonym of Eratoidea hematita (Kiener, 1834)
 Erato inhanbanensis Bozzetti, 2009: synonym of Sulcerato recondita (Melvill & Standen, 1903) (probable synonym)
 Erato lachryma Sowerby, 1832: synonym of Proterato lachryma (Sowerby, 1832)
 Erato lactea Hutton, 1880: synonym of Austroginella muscaria (Lamarck, 1822)
 Erato laevis non Donovan, 1804, Erato maugeriae Gray, 1832 (green erato) and Erato venezuelana Weisbord, 1962 are synonyms for Hespererato maugeriae (Gray, 1832)
 Erato mactanica T. Cossignani & V. Cossignani, 1997: synonym of Alaerato mactanica (T. Cossignani & V. Cossignani, 1997)
 Erato nana Duclos in Reeve, 1865: synonym of Eratoena nana (G. B. Sowerby II, 1859)
 Erato novemprovincialis Yokoyama, 1928: synonym of Gibberula novemprovincialis (Yokoyama, 1928)
 Erato pagoboi T. Cossignani & V. Cossignani, 1997: synonym of Eratoena pagoboi (T. Cossignani & V. Cossignani, 1997)
 Erato panamensis Carpenter, 1856: synonym of Archierato panamaensis (Carpenter, 1856)
 Erato recondita Melvill & Standen, 1903: synonym of Proterato recondita (Melvill & Standen, 1903)
 Erato sandwicensis Pease, 1860: synonym of Eratoena sandwichensis (G. B. Sowerby II, 1859) (original combination)
 Erato sulcifera Gray in Sowerby, 1832: synonym of Eratoena sulcifera (Sowerby, 1832)
 Erato tetatua Hart, 1996: synonym of Trivellona valerieae (Hart, 1996)
 Erato vitellina (Hinds, 1844) - appleseed erato: synonym of Hespererato vitellina (Hinds, 1844)

References

 Vaught, K.C. (1989). A classification of the living Mollusca. American Malacologists: Melbourne, FL (USA). . XII, 195 pp.
 Gofas, S.; Le Renard, J.; Bouchet, P. (2001). Mollusca, in: Costello, M.J. et al. (Ed.) (2001). European register of marine species: a check-list of the marine species in Europe and a bibliography of guides to their identification. Collection Patrimoines Naturels, 50: pp. 180–213

Eratoidae
Gastropod genera